Dan H. Fincher (born November 8, 1931) is an American politician. He served as a Democratic member for the 52nd district of the Georgia State Senate.

Life and career 
Fincher was born in Floyd County, Georgia.

In 1979, Fincher was elected to represent the 52nd district of the Georgia State Senate.

References 

Possibly living people
1931 births
People from Floyd County, Georgia
Democratic Party Georgia (U.S. state) state senators
20th-century American politicians